Craig John Counsell (born August 21, 1970) is an American former professional baseball player who is the  manager for the Milwaukee Brewers of Major League Baseball (MLB). Counsell became the Brewers' manager in May 2015; he became the longest-tenured manager in the National League in 2021, and holds the franchise record for most managerial wins in team history.

Counsell was an infielder who played 16 seasons in MLB for five teams, and was known for his unique batting stance. He had several notable post-season performances, winning the World Series in 1997 with the Florida Marlins and in 2001 with the Arizona Diamondbacks. Counsell has the distinction of having been on base for the last two times that the World Series ended with a walk-off hit, and was named the NLCS Most Valuable Player in 2001.

Early life
Counsell was born in South Bend, Indiana.  He grew up in Whitefish Bay, Wisconsin, and attended Whitefish Bay High School, where he played baseball. His father, John, worked for the Milwaukee Brewers of Major League Baseball (MLB) as their director of the speakers bureau and director of community relations. Counsell attended the University of Notre Dame, where he played for the Notre Dame Fighting Irish baseball team. He was an infielder for the Irish, with a career batting average of .306, 204 runs, 166 RBI, 50 doubles and twice as many walks (166) as strikeouts (82), graduating in 1992.

Professional career
The Colorado Rockies selected Counsell in the 11th round of the 1992 MLB Draft. He made his MLB debut with the Rockies on September 17, 1995, appearing in only three games that season. The Rockies traded Counsell to the Florida Marlins for Mark Hutton in July 1997.  He immediately became the Marlins' starting second baseman. He scored the winning run in the bottom of the 11th inning of Game 7 of the 1997 World Series for the Marlins, on an Édgar Rentería single over pitcher Charles Nagy's head, after tying the game in the bottom of the ninth with a sacrifice fly.

In June 1999, the Marlins traded Counsell to the Los Angeles Dodgers for a player to be named later (minor leaguer Ryan Moskau). The Dodgers released Counsell during 2000 spring training, and he signed with the Arizona Diamondbacks.  His stay with the Diamondbacks lasted four years. Counsell batted 8-for-21 in the 2001 National League Championship Series (NLCS), and won the NLCS Most Valuable Player Award. He was hit by a pitch by Mariano Rivera to load the bases for Luis Gonzalez in the bottom of the 9th inning of Game 7 of the 2001 World Series, after which Gonzalez drove in the winning run for the Diamondbacks, a bloop single over the drawn-in infield.

After the 2003 season, the Diamondbacks traded Counsell to the Milwaukee Brewers, with Chris Capuano, Chad Moeller, Lyle Overbay, Jorge de la Rosa, and Junior Spivey, for Richie Sexson, Shane Nance, and a player to be named later (minor leaguer Noochie Varner). With the Brewers, Counsell started at shortstop in 2004. After one season with the Brewers, Counsell returned to the Diamondbacks as a free agent for two more seasons.

Counsell returned to the Brewers as a free agent for 2007 and filled the role of utility infielder.  He recorded his 1,000th career hit on August 16, 2008, against Derek Lowe of the Los Angeles Dodgers.  In 2011, he was the fourth-oldest player in the National League, and had the second-best career fielding percentage of all active second basemen (.991). In 2009, Counsell gained more regular playing time due to injuries and inconsistent play from other Brewers players, and had a .285 batting average, along with 8 triples, finishing in the top 10 in the National League in the latter category.

In 2010, Counsell was chosen as the 13th-smartest athlete in sports by Sporting News.

From June 11 to August 3, 2011, Counsell tied the all-time record for consecutive at-bats without a base hit for a position player, going hitless over a streak of 45 at-bats as a bench player and spot starter.  The record was set by notoriously poor hitter Bill Bergen in 1909, and later tied by infielder Dave Campbell in 1973. It had been reported Bergen's streak was 46 at bats; however, subsequent research definitively established that Bergen's streak stopped at 45, meaning that Counsell tied but did not break the record. The record was broken only a few weeks after Counsell tied it, by Eugenio Vélez of the Los Angeles Dodgers.

Counsell's contributions to the Marlins' and Diamondbacks' championship teams remained well-remembered by the fans of both teams. During Counsell's last season as a player in 2011, when the Brewers were the visiting team at Marlins and Diamondbacks games, the home fans would give Counsell standing ovations when he came to bat.

Counsell's usual at-bat music was Jimi Hendrix's version of "All Along the Watchtower".

Batting stance 
For much of his career, Counsell had a batting stance that was very distinctive, usually holding his bat high, with his arms straight above his head. As he reached the end of his career, Counsell lowered his bat more in his stance, though he would nearly have his back to the pitcher where the number on his back was almost completely visible to the pitcher. Counsell also didn't wear batting gloves for the majority of his career, with the exception of his rookie season and his final season.

Fielding
By the SAFE: Spatial Aggregate Fielding Evaluation method of evaluating defense, Counsell was both the highest-rated 2nd baseman and the highest-rated 3rd baseman over the period from 2002 to 2008, with an average runs saved of 10.18 and 5.86, respectively.

Post-playing career
In early 2012, Counsell retired as a professional baseball player, and took a front office position with the Brewers. Counsell served as special assistant to general manager Doug Melvin.  In 2014, Counsell was named a part-time color analyst for Brewers radio broadcasts. He rotated with Darryl Hamilton and Jerry Augustine to call games with Joe Block when primary announcer Bob Uecker was absent.

On May 4, 2015, Counsell was hired by the Brewers to become their manager after Ron Roenicke was fired the day before. He signed a three-year contract with the team. The Brewers, going through a rebuild, went 61–76 and 73–89 under Counsell in his first two seasons as manager.

In 2017, the team went on a surprising run, going 86–76. They finished 2nd in the NL Central, falling one win short of a wild card berth. Counsell finished 4th in NL Manager of the Year voting.

In their 2018 campaign, the Brewers went 96-67 under Counsell in the regular season, and won the NL Central by defeating the Chicago Cubs by a score of 3–1 in a tiebreaker game. In 2018 he was successful on a lower percentage of replay challenges than any other MLB manager with 10 or more challenges, at 20.6%. The Brewers advanced to the National League Championship Series after a sweep of the Colorado Rockies in the National League Division Series. The Brewers won the first and sixth games of the 2018 National League Championship Series against the Los Angeles Dodgers at Miller Park in Milwaukee and the third game of the series at Dodger Stadium in Los Angeles, before falling to the Dodgers in seven games. Counsell thus became only the second Brewers manager to lead the team to the postseason after managing a full season with the team. After the season ended, he finished 2nd in NL Manager of the Year voting, losing to Atlanta Braves manager Brian Snitker.

On September 18, 2021, Counsell won his 500th game as a manager, a 6–4 Brewers victory over the Chicago Cubs. He finished 2nd in NL Manager of the Year voting, losing to San Francisco Giants manager Gabe Kapler, with one first place vote, 22 second place votes, and four third place votes.

On June 15, 2022, with a win over the New York Mets, Counsell passed Phil Garner (563) for most wins as a Brewers manager.

Managerial record

Personal life
Counsell and his wife, Michelle, have four children together. The family resides in Whitefish Bay, Wisconsin.

References

External links

1970 births
Living people
Arizona Diamondbacks players
Baseball players from South Bend, Indiana
Bend Rockies players
Central Valley Rockies players
Colorado Rockies players
Colorado Springs Sky Sox players
Florida Marlins players
Lancaster JetHawks players
Los Angeles Dodgers players
Major League Baseball broadcasters
Major League Baseball infielders
Milwaukee Brewers announcers
Milwaukee Brewers players
Milwaukee Brewers managers
National League Championship Series MVPs
New Haven Ravens players
Notre Dame Fighting Irish baseball players
People from Whitefish Bay, Wisconsin
Baseball players from Wisconsin
Tucson Sidewinders players
Whitefish Bay High School alumni
Mat-Su Miners players